Pleasure & Pain is the fifth studio album by British pop/rock group T'Pau. It was released in 2015, and was their first album of new material since Red in 1998.

Overview
The album reached #98 on the UK Albums Chart.

Track listing

Personnel
T'Pau
 Carol Decker – vocals
 Ron Rogers – guitars
 James Ashby – guitars
 Carsten Moss – keyboards
 Kez Gunes – bass
 Dave Hattee – drums
with:
 Odette Adams – backing vocals on "Read My Mind"
Additional musicians on "I Think About You" – Aaron Amun, Alan Thompson, Spencer Cozens, Taj Waygowski, Dean Howard, Scott Firth, John Henderson (note - spellings as per sleeve notes, songwriting credits have "Thomson" and "Wyzgowski")

Production
Produced and mixed by Ron Rogers, except "Read My Mind" produced by Carsten Moss and "Change Your Mind" mixed by Jez Ashurst
Mastered by Pete Maher
Recorded at Up the Lane Recordings, Monmouth

References

2015 albums
T'Pau (band) albums